The 27th Infantry Brigade was an infantry brigade of the British Army that saw service in the First World War, the Second World War, and the Korean War. In Korea, the brigade was known as 27th British Commonwealth Brigade due to the addition of Canadian, Australian, New Zealand and Indian units.

Unit history

First World War 

It was originally formed in August 1914 as the 27th Brigade and was part of the 9th (Scottish) Division, the first of the Kitchener's Army divisions raised from volunteers by Lord Kitchener to serve on the Western Front during the First World War. It was originally composed of the 11th and 12th (Service) Battalions of the Royal Scots, 6th (Service) Battalion Royal Scots Fusiliers and the 10th (Service) Battalion Argyll and Sutherland Highlanders (Princess Louise's).

Second World War 
In 1939 this brigade was reformed, as the 27th Infantry Brigade, in the Territorial Army as part of the 9th (Highland) Infantry Division, a 2nd Line duplicate of the 51st (Highland) Infantry Division. When the 51st (Highland) Division surrendered during the Battle of France in June 1940 the 9th (Highland) Division was redesignated as a new 51st Division. Due to this the 27th Infantry Brigade became the 153rd Infantry Brigade and served with the 51st (Highland) Division in North Africa, Sicily, Italy, and North-West Europe from 1942 to 1945.

Post Second World War 

The Brigade was reformed in 1948 and sent out to Hong Kong, but was then sent on to Korea at the outbreak of the Korean War, where Major Kenneth Muir of the Argylls was awarded the Victoria Cross in September 1950.

Soon after arriving in Korea, the brigade was in action, being involved in the defence of the Pusan Perimeter, on 29 August 1950, and the UN offensive to link with the Inchon landings. The brigade was joined in September 1950 by an Australian contingent, 3rd Battalion, Royal Australian Regiment (3 RAR), and in December 1950 by the 2nd Battalion, Princess Patricia's Canadian Light Infantry. At this time the brigade had few of the support units that were a normal feature of other Commonwealth units in Korea, and were always at a disadvantage in this respect, being reliant on US support units.

After further action during the retreat from the Yalu River, the Chinese Winter Offensive (including Third Battle of Seoul in January 1951) and the UN counter-offensive, the brigade was joined by the specially raised 16 Field Regiment Royal New Zealand Artillery in January 1951, and then a Canadian infantry battalion in February.  The brigade's final action was the Battle of Kapyong in April 1951, a famous last-stand victory. Both the Argylls and Middlesex Regiment were relieved and the brigade was disbanded, to be replaced by the fully constituted 28th British Commonwealth Infantry Brigade, part of 1st Commonwealth Division.

Component units

1914–1918
 11th Battalion, Royal Scots
 12th Battalion, Royal Scots
 6th Battalion, Royal Scots Fusiliers
 10th Battalion, Argyll and Sutherland Highlanders

1939–1940
 5th Battalion, Black Watch
 7th Battalion, Gordon Highlanders
 9th Battalion, Gordon Highlanders
 1st Battalion, Gordon Highlanders

1948 onwards
 1st Battalion, Royal Leicestershire Regiment
 1st Battalion, Middlesex Regiment (to April 1951)
 1st Battalion, Argyll and Sutherland Highlanders (to April 1951)
 2nd Battalion, Princess Patricia's Canadian Light Infantry
 3rd Battalion, Royal Australian Regiment
 16th Field Regiment, Royal New Zealand Artillery
 60th Indian Field Ambulance

Commanders
 27 August 1914: Brigadier-General William Scott-Moncrieff
 7 January 1915: Brigadier-General Clarence Dalrymple Bruce
 26 September 1915: Lieutenant-Colonel Henry Ernest Walshe (acting)
 14 October 1915: Brigadier-General Henry Ernest Walshe
 17 March 1916: Brigadier-General Gerald Frederic Trotter
 2 May 1916: Lieutenant-Colonel W. J. B. Tweedie (acting)
 6 May 1916: Brigadier-General Spencer William Scrase-Dickens
 21 October 1916: Brigadier-General Francis Aylmer Maxwell
 21 September 1917: Lieutenant-Colonel H. D. N. Maclean (acting)
 23 September 1917: Brigadier-General William Denman Croft
 Brigadier G.T. Gurney
 Brigadier William Fraser
 Brigadier D.A.H. Graham

Korean War
 Brigadier Basil Aubrey Coad

References

Bibliography
Gregory Blaxland, The Regiments Depart: A History of the British Army 1945–70, William Kimber, London, 1971.
Brian Catchpole: The Korean War 

Infantry brigades of the British Army
Infantry brigades of the British Army in World War I
Infantry brigades of the British Army in World War II
Military units and formations established in 1939
Military units and formations of the United Kingdom in the Korean War
Military units and formations disestablished in 1951
British Commonwealth units and formations
Brigades of the Korean War